"True Fuschnick" is a song by American hip hop group Fu-Schnickens. The song was recorded for the group's debut album F.U. Don't Take It Personal and released as the third and final single for the album in August 1992.

Track listing
12", 33⅓ RPM, Vinyl
"True Fuschnick" (LP Version) - 3:58
"True Fuschnick" (Shaheed's Fix) - 4:39
"Props" - 5:36
"True Fuschnick" (Instrumental) - 3:58

CD, Maxi-Single
"True Fuschnick" (LP Version) - 3:58
"True Fuschnick" (Shaheed's Fix) - 4:39
"Props" - 5:36
"True Fuschnick" (Instrumental) - 3:58
"Ring the Alarm" (Steely & Cleevie Extended Mix) - 4:54

Personnel
Information taken from Discogs.
mastering – Tom Coyne
mixing – Fu-Schnickens, Ali Shaheed Muhammad, Bob Power
production – A Tribe Called Quest, Fu-Schnickens
recording engineering – Anthony Saunders
remix engineering – Ali Shaheed Muhammad, Bob Power
remixing – Ali Shaheed Muhammad, Steely & Clevie
writing – G. Clinton Jr., G. Cook, J. Jones, L. Maturine, A. Muhammad, R. Roachford

Chart performance

References 

1992 songs
1992 singles
Fu-Schnickens songs
Jive Records singles
Songs written by Ali Shaheed Muhammad